I Didn't Know About You is the debut studio album by American jazz singer Karrin Allyson. The album was released in 1992 via Concord Jazz label. She has remained with Concord Jazz for her next 13 albums issued through 2011.

Reception
Jack Fuller of the Chicago Tribune stated: "This young singer is terrific. Part cabaret, part Cassandra Wilson, Karrin Allyson has a lovely musical range and a sharp, clear, slightly nasal voice which is capable of stunning scat and other instrumental effects as well as the straight, lyrical approach. Here, she also shows her gifts as an arranger. Some of the interplay she sets up with the small group with which she performs is memorable."

Scott Yanow of Allmusic wrote: "This CD was the debut of the talented singer Karrin Allyson, a creative scat singer also very capable of holding her own on ballads. She primarily utilizes top Kansas City musicians (including pianists Paul Smith, Russ Long and Joe Cartwright, guitarists Danny Embrey and Rod Fleeman, bassists Bob Bowman and Gerald Spaits, drummer Todd Strait, cornetist Gary Sivils and flugelhornist Mike Metheny) on a variety of bop-based material. Among the highlights are 'Nature Boy,' Karrin's chancetaking duet with drummer Strait on 'What a Little Moonlight Can Do,' a rapid version of ''S Wonderful' and a bossa-novatized 'It Might As Well Be Spring.' Karrin Allyson, who also plays piano on three numbers, shows a great deal of potential throughout her rewarding debut."

Track listing

Personnel
Band
Karrin Allyson – piano, vocals, producer
Doug Auwarter – percussion
Bob Bowman – bass
Joe Cartwright – piano
Danny Embrey – guitar (electric), producer
Rod Fleeman – guitar (acoustic)
Bryan Hicks – vocals
Russ Long – composer, piano
Mike Metheny – flugelhorn
Gary Sivils – cornet
Paul E. Smith – piano
Gerald Spaits – bass
Todd Strait – drums, percussion

Production
John Blank – engineer
Bill McGlaughlin – liner notes
Ron Ubel – engineer

References

1992 debut albums
Karrin Allyson albums